Denver Molly Brown is a club ultimate team from Denver, Colorado that competes in the Women's Club division of USA Ultimate (USAU). Molly Brown is a perennial contender in USAU competition, claiming, as of the 2019 season, a spot in the Women's division "Big Four." The team made its first appearance at the WFDF World Ultimate Club Championships in 2018, finishing tied for 3rd with Boston Brute Squad.

Team history 
Molly Brown was founded in 2010, and is named in tribute to 20th century Colorado suffragette and Titanic survivor Maggie “Molly” Brown. In the spirit of the original Molly Brown's activism, the team has also become known for its activism off the field, both locally and nationally by supporting women’s and youth participation and development in ultimate.

Current coaching staff 

 Head coach – Joe Durst
 Assistant coach – Joaquin Nagle

Roster

References 

Sports teams in Denver
Women's sports teams in the United States
Ultimate (sport) teams
Ultimate teams established in 2010
2010 establishments in Colorado
Women in Colorado